Denmark  competed at the 2019 World Aquatics Championships in Gwangju, South Korea from 12 to 28 July.

Swimming

Denmark entered 12 swimmers.

Men

Women

Mixed

References

Nations at the 2019 World Aquatics Championships
Denmark at the World Aquatics Championships
2019 in Danish sport